Riga Film Studio is a Latvian film production company based in Riga and founded in 1940 on the basis of the earlier private film companies. In 1948, the Riga Documentary Film Studio was founded.

In 1970–80, the company produced 10-15 films a year, providing work for 1,000 employees.

Currently, there are no major filmings. The studio earns by leasing its facilities, offering expert services, and licensing films to distribution in Riga.

In 2007, a bill was rejected by the Council of Ministers of Latvia to privatize 125 films by RFS, they are still the State property.

Notable films made by Riga Film Studio

References

External links 
 Official site of Riga Film Studio
 Riga Documentary Film Studio (RDFS, Latfilma)
 National TV broadcast Latvia Soviet Socialist Republic ("Riga Telefilm"), Riga Film Studio at Animator.ru
 FIPRESCI - Festival Reports - Riga 2006 - Latvian Animation Films

1940 establishments in Latvia
Film production companies of the Soviet Union
Companies based in Riga
Mass media companies established in 1940